Bloaters are a type of whole cold-smoked herring. Bloaters are "salted and lightly smoked without gutting, giving a characteristic slightly gamey flavour" and are particularly associated with Great Yarmouth, England. Popular in the 19th and early 20th centuries, the food is now described as rare. Bloaters are sometimes called Yarmouth bloater, or, jokingly, as a Yarmouth capon, two-eyed steak, or Billingsgate pheasant (after the Billingsgate Fish Market in London).

The bloater is associated with England, while kippers share an association with Scotland and the Isle of Man (the Manx kipper). Bloaters are "salted less and smoked for a shorter time" while kippers are "lightly salted and smoked overnight"; both dishes are referred to as red herring. According to George Orwell in The Road to Wigan Pier, "The Emperor Charles V is said to have erected a statue to the inventor of bloaters." They are given the name "bloater" since they are swelled, or "bloated" in preparation.

Bucklings, bloaters and kippers 
All three are types of smoked herring. Buckling is hot-smoked whole; bloaters are cold-smoked whole; kippers are split and gutted, and then cold-smoked.

See also 

 Buckling (fish)
 List of smoked foods

References 

English cuisine
Fish processing
Food preservation
Oily fish
Smoked fish
Herring dishes